Louis-Marie Ling Mangkhanekhoun I.V.D. (born 8 April 1944) is a Laotian prelate of the Roman Catholic Church. A bishop since 2001, he has been a cardinal since 28 June 2017 and the Apostolic Vicar of the Apostolic Vicariate of Vientiane, in Laos, since 16 December 2017. He is also the first cardinal from Laos.

Biography
He speaks Khmu, Laotian, French, and English.
He is sometimes referred to as Bishop or Cardinal Ling.

He is an ethnic Khmu. He was baptized a Catholic in 1952 after missionaries converted his mother. In the 1960s he studied philosophy and theology at the Voluntas Dei seminary in the Diocese of Edmundston, New Brunswick, Canada. He was ordained a priest in a hurried ceremony in a refugee camp on 5 November 1972 for the Apostolic Vicariate of Vientiane, Laos. He spent the years 1984 to 1987 in prison.

On 30 October 2000 Pope John Paul II appointed him Apostolic Vicar of Paksé and titular bishop of Aquae Novae in Proconsulari. He was consecrated a bishop on 22 April 2001 by Bishop Jean Khamsé Vithavong, Apostolic Vicar of Vientiane.

He developed a system of seminary education that requires a candidate for the priesthood, after three years of study, to spend one to three years in pastoral work. He explained that they are "catechists, carrying medicines, aid, prayers for the people of the mountain. They integrate with the villagers, live as the villagers do in everything."

He is a member of Institut Voluntas Dei, founded in 1958 at Trois-Rivières, Quebec. He took his first name Louis-Marie from its founder, Fr. .

On 21 May 2017, Pope Francis announced his intention to make Mangkhanekhoun a cardinal. He was made a cardinal at a consistory on 28 June 2017.

On 11 December 2016, his cousin was declared a blessed in the Catholic Church, Blessed Luc Sy (1938–1970), one of the Martyrs of Laos.

On 16 December 2017, Pope Francis named him Apostolic Vicar of Vientiane. Francis made him a member of the Dicastery for Promoting Integral Human Development on 23 December 2017.

References

External links

 
Apostolic Vicariate of Paksé (GCatholic.org)

1944 births
21st-century Roman Catholic bishops in Laos
Living people
People from Champasak province
Cardinals created by Pope Francis
Laotian cardinals